The 2012 Norfolk State Spartans football team represented Norfolk State University in the 2012 NCAA Division I FCS football season. They were led by eighth-year head coach Pete Adrian and played their home games at William "Dick" Price Stadium. They are a member of the Mid-Eastern Athletic Conference (MEAC). They finished the season 4–7, 2–6 in MEAC play to finish in a tie for ninth place.

Schedule

Source: Schedule

Ranking movements

References

Norfolk State
Norfolk State Spartans football seasons
Norfolk State Spartans football